Luís Leal dos Anjos (born 29 May 1987), known as Leal, is a professional footballer who plays as a striker for Bolivian club Guabirá and the São Tomé and Príncipe national team.

He achieved Primeira Liga totals of 67 games and 19 goals for União de Leiria, Estoril and Belenenses, but spent most of his career abroad, playing top-flight football in Saudi Arabia, the United Arab Emirates, Turkey, Cyprus, Paraguay, Mexico, Argentina and Bolivia.

Born in Portugal, Leal represented São Tomé and Príncipe at international level.

Club career

Portugal
Born in Arrentela, Setúbal District in Portugal, Leal joined Sporting CP's youth system at the age of 11, moving after four years to C.D. Cova da Piedade. He made his senior debut with the latter, playing a couple of seasons in the fourth division.

Leal then had two solid campaigns in the third tier, one apiece with Atlético Clube de Portugal and Moreirense FC, continuing his professional progression in summer 2010 by signing with G.D. Estoril Praia in the Segunda Liga. He made his debut in the Primeira Liga in the 2011–12 campaign with U.D. Leiria, appearing in his first game in the competition on 15 August 2011 against Académica de Coimbra (17 minutes played, 1–2 home loss).

In 2012, after Leiria's relegation – and further demotion to division three due to irregularities – Leal returned to Estoril, with the team now in the top flight. He started the season in impressive fashion, scoring a hat-trick in a 3–1 home win over C.S. Marítimo and one goal in a 2–2 draw at former club Sporting.

Abroad
On 18 June 2015, after brief spells at Al Ahli Saudi FC, Al-Ittihad Kalba SC and Gaziantepspor, Leal signed a two-year contract with Cypriot First Division club APOEL FC. He made his debut on 14 July, in a 0–0 home draw against FK Vardar in the second qualifying round of the UEFA Champions League.

Leal scored his first two goals for APOEL on 22 August 2015, in a 5–1 away victory over Ermis Aradippou FC. Eight days later, however, after underperforming in the Champions League's qualifiers, he was sent on loan to C.F. Os Belenenses until the end of the season.

On 26 January 2016, Leal joined Cerro Porteño for an undisclosed fee, agreeing to a two-year deal. He made his debut in the Paraguayan Primera División five days later, in a 2–1 away loss to Sportivo Luqueño where he came on as a 64th-minute substitute for Sergio Díaz; one week later, he scored a double to help to a 3–0 home defeat of General Caballero Sport Club.

Leal returned to the Saudi Professional League in August 2016, joining Al Fateh SC. Only months into his spell at the Prince Abdullah bin Jalawi Stadium, the player's agent Óscar Díaz stated that he wanted to return to Cerro. He left in January 2017, signing for Chiapas F.C. in Mexico's Liga MX. His first goal for the Jaguares was on 26 February, the team's last in a 4–3 home comeback win over CD Guadalajara.

In August 2017, Leal returned to South America, loaned for a US$150,000 fee to Newell's Old Boys in Argentina with the option to buy. He scored his first goal in the Argentine Primera División on 16 September to open a 2–0 home victory against Club Olimpo. In July 2018, he signed a three-year contract when the Rosario-based club purchased 85% of his economic rights.

In August 2020, Leal returned to Mexico's top flight with Club Tijuana. He totalled nine games for the Xolos, including their defeat to CF Monterrey in the Copa MX final in October.

Leal made a move to another country he already knew in January 2021, when he signed a one-year deal at Club Sol de América in Paraguay. On 31 December, he switched to the Bolivian Primera División with Club Deportivo Guabirá.

International career
Born in Portugal, Leal expressed his desire to represent his parents' homeland of São Tomé and Príncipe internationally. He made his debut on 16 June 2012 in a 2013 Africa Cup of Nations qualification match against Sierra Leone, and scored his first goal on 13 June 2015 in the 7–1 defeat in Cape Verde for the 2017 Africa Cup of Nations qualifiers.

In October 2019, Leal scored three of São Tomé and Príncipe's goals in a 5–2 aggregate win over Mauritius to reach the group stage of qualification for the 2021 Africa Cup of Nations. On 24 March 2022, he scored the only goal in the 1–0 victory against the same team in the preliminary round of qualification for the 2023 CAN, and also found the net in the return leg five days later, a 3–3 draw; he was subsequently found to have been ineligible for the first of these matches due to breaching COVID-19 rules, and Mauritius were awarded a 3–0 win, only for São Tomé to be later reinstated.

Career statistics

Club

International

 São Tomé and Príncipe score listed first, score column indicates score after each Leal goal.

References

External links

1987 births
Living people
People from Seixal
People with acquired São Tomé and Príncipe citizenship
Portuguese people of São Tomé and Príncipe descent
Sportspeople from Setúbal District
Portuguese footballers
São Tomé and Príncipe footballers
Association football forwards
Primeira Liga players
Liga Portugal 2 players
Segunda Divisão players
C.D. Cova da Piedade players
Atlético Clube de Portugal players
Moreirense F.C. players
G.D. Estoril Praia players
U.D. Leiria players
C.F. Os Belenenses players
Saudi Professional League players
Al-Ahli Saudi FC players
Al-Fateh SC players
UAE Pro League players
Al-Ittihad Kalba SC players
Süper Lig players
Gaziantepspor footballers
Cypriot First Division players
APOEL FC players
Paraguayan Primera División players
Cerro Porteño players
Club Sol de América footballers
Liga MX players
Chiapas F.C. footballers
Club Tijuana footballers
Argentine Primera División players
Newell's Old Boys footballers
Bolivian Primera División players
Guabirá players
São Tomé and Príncipe international footballers
Portuguese expatriate footballers
São Tomé and Príncipe expatriate footballers
Expatriate footballers in Saudi Arabia
Expatriate footballers in the United Arab Emirates
Expatriate footballers in Turkey
Expatriate footballers in Cyprus
Expatriate footballers in Paraguay
Expatriate footballers in Mexico
Expatriate footballers in Argentina
Expatriate footballers in Bolivia
Portuguese expatriate sportspeople in Saudi Arabia
Portuguese expatriate sportspeople in the United Arab Emirates
Portuguese expatriate sportspeople in Turkey
Portuguese expatriate sportspeople in Cyprus
Portuguese expatriate sportspeople in Paraguay
Portuguese expatriate sportspeople in Mexico
Portuguese expatriate sportspeople in Argentina
Portuguese expatriates in Bolivia
São Tomé and Príncipe expatriate sportspeople in Saudi Arabia
São Tomé and Príncipe expatriate sportspeople in the United Arab Emirates
São Tomé and Príncipe expatriate sportspeople in Turkey
São Tomé and Príncipe expatriate sportspeople in Cyprus
São Tomé and Príncipe expatriate sportspeople in Paraguay
São Tomé and Príncipe expatriate sportspeople in Mexico
São Tomé and Príncipe expatriate sportspeople in Argentina
São Tomé and Príncipe expatriates in Bolivia